The Somerville Public Schools are a comprehensive community public school district that serves students in pre-kindergarten through twelfth grade from Somerville, in Somerset County, New Jersey, United States.

As of the 2018–19 school year, the district, comprised of three schools, had an enrollment of 2,398 students and 204.7 classroom teachers (on an FTE basis), for a student–teacher ratio of 11.7:1.

The district is classified by the New Jersey Department of Education as being in District Factor Group "FG", the fourth-highest of eight groupings. District Factor Groups organize districts statewide to allow comparison by common socioeconomic characteristics of the local districts. From lowest socioeconomic status to highest, the categories are A, B, CD, DE, FG, GH, I and J.

Students from Branchburg Township attend the district's high school as part of a sending/receiving relationship with the Branchburg Township School District. For many years, Branchburg has accounted for 60-65% of the high school's enrollment.

History
The sending / receiving relationship between Branchburg and Somerville was formalized in a 1956 agreement between the two districts, though Branchburg students had attended Somerville High School before that time. In 1970, the Somerville district determined that rising enrollments meant that it would no longer be able to include students from Branchburg and set 1975 as the end date for the sending relationship. Branchburg started the process of acquiring a  site for its own high school that could accommodate up to 950 students.

In May 1971, Somerville reconsidered its planned termination of the sending arrangement and informed Branchburg that its students would still be welcome in Somerville even after the planned 1975 date. Despite the failure of a referendum to pay for a new Branchburg high school, the Branchburg district decided that it wanted to terminate the relationship, even after Somerville had reconsidered its decision. Branchburg filed a petition in 1975 with the New Jersey Department of Education seeking to terminate the send/receive agreement.

Based on a report by the hearing examiner released in 1977, Commissioner of Education Fred G. Burke issued a 1978 decision that the petition be rejected based on the ability of Somerville to serve students from Branchburg with a quality high school education, the financial impact of higher per-pupil costs to both municipalities and the creation of greater racial imbalance in the Somerville district. The State Board of Education agreed with the Commissioner's decision and Branchburg's appeal to the Superior Court of New Jersey, Appellate Division was rejected in a 1980 decision.

Awards and recognition
Somerville Public Schools was voted one of the "100 Top Schools in Towns You Can Afford" in the January 1996 issue of Money magazine. Somerville High School was ranked as one of the "Top 75 Public High Schools" by New Jersey Monthly magazine in its September 1996 issue.

Somerville Public Schools was ranked #631 in The Daily Beast / Newsweek list of "America's Best High Schools 2012".

Schools
Schools in the district (with 2018–19 enrollment data from the National Center for Education Statistics) are:
Elementary school
Van Derveer Elementary School with 802 students in grades PreK-5
Robert Reavey, Principal
LaNova Schall, Assistant Principal
Middle school
Somerville Middle School with 371 students in grades 6-8
Anthony Benjamin, Principal
Lani Perruso, Assistant Principal
High school
Somerville High School with 1,195 students in grades 9-12
Gerard T. Foley, Principal
Scott Hade, Assistant Principal

Administration
Core members of the district's administration are:
Timothy Teehan, Superintendent
Bryan P. Boyce, Business Administrator / Board Secretary

Board of education
The district's board of education, comprised of nine members, sets policy and oversees the fiscal and educational operation of the district through its administration. As a Type II school district, the board's trustees are elected directly by voters to serve three-year terms of office on a staggered basis, with three seats up for election each year held (since 2012) as part of the November general election. The board appoints a superintendent to oversee the day-to-day operation of the district. A tenth representative is chosen by the Branchburg district to represent its interest on the Somerville board.

References

External links
Somerville Public Schools

School Data for the Somerville Public Schools, National Center for Education Statistics

Somerville, New Jersey
New Jersey District Factor Group FG
School districts in Somerset County, New Jersey